Amateur Sport Club Sankt Georgen or simply St. Georgen is an Italian association football club, based in the fraction St. Georgen of Bruneck, South Tyrol. St. Georgen currently plays in Serie D.

History 
The club was founded in 1968.

In the season 2010–11 the team was promoted from Eccellenza Trentino-Alto Adige/Südtirol to Serie D.

On 2 May 2018 the club won the Coppa Italia Dilettanti (the first team from Südtirol to do that) and won promotion to Serie D.

Colors and badge 
The team's color are white and red.

Current squad 
 See ascstgeorgen.it

References

External links 
 Official website

Football clubs in Trentino-Alto Adige/Südtirol
Association football clubs established in 1968
1968 establishments in Italy